Andreas Werckmeister (November 30, 1645 – October 26, 1706) was a German organist, music theorist, and composer of the Baroque era. He was amongst the earliest advocates of equal temperament, and through this advocacy was highly influential to the harmonic basis underlying almost all of subsequent Western music.

Life
Born in Benneckenstein, Werckmeister attended schools in Nordhausen and Quedlinburg. He received his musical training from his uncles Heinrich Christian Werckmeister and Heinrich Victor Werckmeister. In 1664 he became an organist in Hasselfelde; ten years later in Elbingerode; and in 1696 of the Martinskirche in Halberstadt.

Musical compositions
Of his compositions only a booklet remains: pieces for violin with basso continuo, with the title Musikalische Privatlust (1689).
Also some organ works remain: Canzon in a-minor, Canzona in d-minor, Praeludium ex G, Canzonetta in D-major.

Theoretical works
Werckmeister is best known today as a theorist, in particular through his writings Musicae mathematicae hodegus curiosus... (1687) and Musikalische Temperatur (1691), in which he described a system of what we would now refer to as well temperament (named after Bach's opus "The Well-Tempered Clavier") now known as Werckmeister temperament.

Werckmeister's writings – particularly his writings on counterpoint – were well known to Johann Sebastian Bach. Werckmeister believed that well-crafted counterpoint, especially invertible counterpoint, was tied to the orderly movements of the planets, reminiscent of Kepler's view in Harmonice Mundi.  According to George Buelow, "No other writer of the period regarded music so unequivocally as the end result of God’s work". Yet in spite of his focus on counterpoint, Werckmeister's work emphasized underlying harmonic principles.

List of works
 Musicae mathematicae hodegus curiosus... (1687)
 Musikalische Temperatur, oder... (1691)
 Der Edlen Music-Kunst... (1691)
 Hypomnemata musica (1697)
 Erweierte und verbesserte Orgel-Probe (1698)
 Die nothwendigsten Anmerckungen und Reglen, wie der Bassus continuus... (1698)
 Cribrum musicum (1700)
 Harmonologia musica (1702)
 Musikalische Paradoxal-Discourse (1707)

See also
Werckmeister Harmonies

References

Further reading
 David Yearsley, Bach and the Meanings of Counterpoint.  New Perspectives in Music History and Criticism.  Cambridge and New York:  Cambridge University Press, 2002.

External links
 
"Well Temperaments based on the Werckmeister Definition"
Bio (in French) which contains details of locations of surviving copies of Werckmeister's publications
 Well Tempered based on Werckmeisters last book Musikalische Paradoxal-Discourse (1707) is Equal Temperament see: https://www.academia.edu/5210832/18th_Century_Quotes_on_J.S._Bachs_Temperament
 Edition of Canzon in a (organ work) https://www.free-scores.com/sheetmusic?p=aXAgQAhxny#

1645 births
1706 deaths
People from Oberharz am Brocken
German music theorists
German classical organists
German male organists
German Baroque composers
18th-century keyboardists
German male classical composers
Male classical organists